Abu l-`Abbas Ahmad ibn Muhammad ibn Shuayb al-Kirjani, known as Ibn Shuayb or Ibn Suhayb (died 1 March 1349) was a Moroccan scholar of medicine, alchemy, botany, astronomy, mathematics, a poet,  and the chancellor of the Marinid sultan Abu al Hassan. He was born in Taza, and died in Tunis.

References

Sources
 

Moroccan scholars
Moroccan writers
1349 deaths
Medieval Moroccan astronomers
Astronomers of the medieval Islamic world
Medieval Moroccan mathematicians
People from Taza
Year of birth unknown
14th-century Moroccan physicians